Daniel Armin Cerny (born December 11, 1981) is an American  actor, producer, singer, musician and film editor, best known for his role in the 1995 horror film Children of the Corn III: Urban Harvest.

Life and career
Cerny was born in 1981 in Los Angeles, the son of Helena and Pavel Cerny. His brother is politician Andrei Cherny. His parents are Czechoslovakian Jewish immigrants, who were dissidents in Prague. He expressed interest in film and acting at a young age, and made his debut in Doc Hollywood (1991) with a minor role, followed by playing the manifestation of an evil spirit in the horror film Demonic Toys (1992). In 1994, he was cast in a supporting role in Peter Weir's Fearless (1993) opposite Jeff Bridges.

He played the lead role of Eli Porter in the 1995 horror film Children of the Corn III: Urban Harvest. Cerny gave up acting after the film, only returning for a minor part in an episode of the miniseries Revelations (2005) opposite Bill Pullman, and a supporting part in the direct-to-video sequel The Prince & Me II: The Royal Wedding (2006). Cerny worked as an assistant editor on the television series TransGeneration (2005) and The Janice Dickinson Modeling Agency (2006).

Filmography

References

1981 births
Living people
American male film actors
American people of Czech descent
Male actors from Los Angeles